

TorrentFreak (TF) is a blog dedicated to reporting the latest news and trends on the BitTorrent protocol and file sharing, as well as on copyright infringement and digital rights.

The website was started in November 2005 by a Dutchman using the pseudonym "Ernesto Van Der Sar". He was joined by Andy "Enigmax" Maxwell and Ben Jones in 2007. Regular contributors include Rickard Falkvinge, founder of the Pirate Party. The online publication eCommerceTimes, in 2009, described "Ernesto" as the pseudonym of Lennart Renkema, owner of TorrentFreak. TorrentFreak's text is free content under a Creative Commons Attribution-NonCommercial version 3.0 license.

Their lead researcher and community manager is the Pirate Party activist Andrew Norton.

Specialist areas
According to Canadian law scholar Michael Geist, TorrentFreak "is widely used as a source of original reporting on digital issues". Examples are The Guardian, CNN, The Wall Street Journal, and the Flemish newspaper De Standaard.

Frequent areas of reporting include:
 The City of London's Police Intellectual Property Crime Unit
 United States Trade Representative and Notorious Markets reports
 Anti-piracy web blocking
 Torrent tracker news
 VPN and seedbox reviews
 File sharing website news
 Copyright law news
 Warez scene news

As well as other news affecting copyright, privacy, file sharing and adjacent topics.

Editorial stance 
In a 2021 article, Andy Maxwell outlined TorrentFreak's editorial stance. He wrote: "As a publication entirely dedicated to reporting on copyright, piracy, torrent and streaming sites (plus all things closely related), here at TorrentFreak we aim to tell all 'sides' of the story. We do not shy away from reports that show that piracy hurts sales and we have no problem publishing research projects that show completely the opposite. It's called balanced reporting and it hurts absolutely no one."

History
On 17 August 2007, TorrentFreak reported that Comcast had begun throttling its upload bandwidth, specifically against BitTorrent users. This made seeding, which is an essential part of the BitTorrent protocol, effectively impossible. It was later determined that Comcast was using Sandvine products, which implement network traffic shaping and policing, and include support for both blocking new and forcefully terminating established network connections. Comcast has denied these claims whenever they have been asked to comment. A guide, for customer service representatives when asked about Comcast's BitTorrent throttling, was leaked to The Consumerist on 26 October 2007.

In October 2008 through to March 2011 TorrentFreak ran a short lived video news service titled 'torrentfreak.tv', directed by Andrej Preston, founder of torrent site Suprnova made available for streaming and download on Mininova.

On 21 August 2013, Comcast threatened TorrentFreak for writing about publicly available court documents. The underlying document links a Comcast subscriber with the Prenda Law firm. The court case where the document was filed was a copyright infringement lawsuit brought by AF Holdings for alleged infringement of an adult movie.

In August 2013, Sky Broadband blocked the site for UK customers after torrent site EZTV pointed its DNS servers to TorrentFreak's IP address and, in July 2014, the site was blocked by the controversial Sky Broadband Shield parental filter system.

References

External links
 

News websites
File sharing communities
BitTorrent
Publications established in 2005
Free-content websites
Copyright infringement
File sharing news sites